Dangan (also Romanized as Dangān; also known as Dankan) is a village in Hashivar Rural District, in the Central District of Darab County, Fars Province, Iran. At the 2006 census, its population was 542, in 114 families.

References 

Populated places in Darab County